A neutron-velocity selector is a device that allows neutrons of defined velocity to pass while absorbing all other neutrons, to produce a monochromatic neutron beam. It has the appearance of a many-bladed turbine. The blades are coated with a strongly neutron-absorbing material, such as Boron-10.

Neutron-velocity selectors are commonly used in neutron research facility to produce a monochromatic beam of neutrons. Due to physical limitations of materials and motors, limiting the maximum speed of rotation of the blades, these devices are only useful for relatively slow neutrons.

References

External links
 A commercially available neutron velocity selector for neutron research

Biological techniques and tools
Neutron-related techniques